Horace O. Moss House, also known as Preferred Manor, is a historic home located at New Berlin in Chenango County, New York. It was built in 1831 and is a 2-story, five-by-five-bay, fieldstone house with a 1-story frame addition and truncated hip roof with central belvedere.  It was reportedly designed by Richard Upjohn and features an elegant Federal period interior.  It is located in the New Berlin Historic District.

It was added to the National Register of Historic Places in 1974.

References

Houses on the National Register of Historic Places in New York (state)
Federal architecture in New York (state)
Houses completed in 1831
Houses in Chenango County, New York
National Register of Historic Places in Chenango County, New York